The 2017 Dafabet English Open was a professional ranking snooker tournament that took place from 16 to 22 October 2017 in Barnsley, South Yorkshire, England. It was the seventh ranking event of the 2017/2018 season and a part of the Home Nations Series.

Liang Wenbo was the defending champion, having beaten Judd Trump 9–6 in the 2016 final. Wenbo made a maximum break in his second round match against Tom Ford, but lost in the third round to Yan Bingtao. His maximum won him the "rolling 147 prize" of £40,000.

Ronnie O'Sullivan captured his 29th ranking title by beating Kyren Wilson 9–2 in the final. With his win O'Sullivan tied John Higgins for 2nd place on the all-time list of ranking event wins, only behind Stephen Hendry.

Prize fund
The breakdown of prize money for this year is shown below:

 Winner: £70,000
 Runner-up: £30,000
 Semi-final: £20,000
 Quarter-final: £10,000
 Last 16: £6,000
 Last 32: £3,500
 Last 64: £2,500

 Highest break: £2,000
 Total: £366,000

The "rolling 147 prize" for a maximum break stood at £40,000

Main draw

Qualifying round

Top half

Section 1

Section 2

Section 3

Section 4

Bottom half

Section 5

Section 6

Section 7

Section 8

Finals

Final

Century breaks
Total: 83

 147, 107, 105  Liang Wenbo
 144, 132, 130, 128  Jack Lisowski
 143, 128, 114, 105  Judd Trump
 141, 127, 112, 104, 104  Stuart Bingham
 140, 124, 118, 109, 109, 106, 103  Kyren Wilson
 140, 104  Liam Highfield
 139, 136, 134, 133, 132, 131, 129, 127, 127, 126, 125, 115  Ronnie O'Sullivan
 139  Thor Chuan Leong
 138, 131  John Higgins
 136, 135, 134  Shaun Murphy
 136  Mitchell Mann
 135  Marco Fu
 134, 132  Neil Robertson
 132, 115, 105  Matthew Stevens
 131  Ian Preece
 131  David Gilbert
 128, 100  Michael White
 127  Ali Carter
 126  Tian Pengfei
 124  Mark Selby
 123, 104, 104  Yuan Sijun
 123  Barry Hawkins
 123  Alexander Ursenbacher
 121  Scott Donaldson
 120  Stuart Carrington
 116  Aditya Mehta
 113  Ding Junhui
 112  Sunny Akani
 111  Yan Bingtao
 110, 105  Tom Ford
 110  Ross Muir
 110  Xiao Guodong
 108  James Wattana
 107, 101  Jimmy Robertson
 107  Fang Xiongman
 106  Robin Hull
 104  Hamza Akbar
 104  Jamie Jones
 102  Chen Zifan
 101  Craig Steadman
 100  Mark Joyce
 100  Anthony McGill

References

Home Nations Series
2017
English Open
English Open (snooker)
Sport in Barnsley
English Open